MV Red Jet 7 is a British high speed catamaran ferry  operated by the ferry company Red Funnel on its Southampton-Cowes route, alongside the company's other current Red Jets 4 and 6. Constructed on site at the Wight Shipyard where Red Jet 6 was also built, it has been built to a similar specification as its predecessor. Red Jet 7 was launched on 6 June 2018 and underwent system tests prior to being placed into service for 24 July 2018, in time for the surge in traffic over Cowes Week.

References

External links 

 

Ferries of England
2018 ships
Individual catamarans
Ships of Red Funnel
Ferry transport on the Isle of Wight